Benjamin Thomas Fisher (born 4 February 1981), also known by the nickname of "Fish", is a former Scotland international rugby league footballer who was player-assistant coach for the London Broncos in the Super League. A Scotland international representative Hooker, he previously played for Hull Kingston Rovers of Super League, and Halifax.

Club career

Halifax RLFC
Fisher signed for Halifax from North Sydney Bears in November 2004 and the Sydney-born number nine, has a British passport so is not an overseas quota player. Ben spent three seasons on the books of the Sydney Roosters before joining the Bears in 2001, scooped the club's "Best and Fairest" player award. In 31 appearances in 2005 season for Halifax he scored 17 tries. And he is one of Rovers' growing band of internationals, being a member of the Scotland squad.

Hull KR
In May 2008 Ben signed an extension to his contract keeping him at Hull Kingston Rovers until the end of 2011.

International

Scotland
He was named in the Scotland training squad for the 2008 Rugby League World Cup.

He was named in the Scotland squad for the 2008 Rugby League World Cup.

In 2010 he represented Scotland in the Alitalia European Cup.

Chile
On 30 September 2017 he represented Chile in the 20–20 draw v Thailand at the Hillier Oval, in Sydney; he played .

References

External links

(archived by web.archive.org) Hull KR profile
(archived by web.archive.org) Super League Player profile
New Deal for Rovers Hooker Fisher

1981 births
Living people
Australian people of Scottish descent
Australian rugby league players
Batley Bulldogs players
Catalans Dragons players
Chile national rugby league team players
Halifax R.L.F.C. players
Hull Kingston Rovers players
London Broncos players
Rugby league hookers
Rugby league players from Sydney
Scotland national rugby league team captains
Scotland national rugby league team players